William Jones (born March 5, 1995) is a Canadian sailor in the 49er class with partner Evan DePaul.

Career
In 2017, Jones and partner Evan DePaul won gold at the World Junior Sailing Championships in the 49er class.

In March 2021, Jones was named to Canada's 2020 Olympic team with his partner Evan DePaul, by being ranked as the top Canadian boat at the 2020 World Championships.

References

External links
 

1995 births
Living people
Canadian male sailors (sport)
Sportspeople from Hamilton, Ontario

World champions in sailing for Canada

Sailors at the 2020 Summer Olympics – 49er